Come Find Yourself is the debut studio album by the American band Fun Lovin' Criminals. It was released on February 20, 1996 by Chrysalis Records.

Track listing 
All tracks written by Fun Lovin' Criminals, except where noted.

 "The Fun Lovin' Criminal" – 3:13
 "Passive/Aggressive" – 3:33
 "The Grave and the Constant" – 4:47
 "Scooby Snacks" – 3:05
 "Smoke 'Em" – 4:46
 "Bombin' the L" – 3:51
 "I Can't Get with That" – 4:25
 "King of New York" – 3:47
 "We Have All the Time in the World" (John Barry, Hal David) – 3:41
 "Bear Hug" – 3:28
 "Come Find Yourself" – 4:20
 "Crime and Punishment" – 3:20
 "Methadonia" – 4:06
 "I Can't Get with That (Schmoove Version)" (bonus track) – 5:34
 "Coney Island Girl" (bonus track) – 1:28

Personnel 
Huey Morgan – vocals (all), guitar (all but 10)
Brian Leiser – bass (1–4, 6, 12, 15), keyboard (3, 7–9, 11, 13–14), trumpet (1, 3, 5, 8-9, 11, 13–14), harmonica (1, 6, 10, 13, 15)
Steve Borgovini – drums (all), percussion (10, 14)
Fun Lovin' Criminals – production
Tim Latham – engineering
Tsukasa Tobiishi – cover photography

Charts

Certifications

References

1996 debut albums
Fun Lovin' Criminals albums
Chrysalis Records albums
Concept albums